The Soyuz-7 or Amur is a partially-reusable, methane–fueled, orbital launch vehicle currently in the design concept stage of development by the Roscosmos State Corporation in Russia.  Design began by 2020, with operational flights planned for no earlier than 2026.  Amur is intended to substitute for the existing Soyuz-2, at a much lower per launch cost.

This is a proposed family of new Russian rockets proposed by JSC SRC Progress in the mid-2010s, to replace the legacy Soyuz for launch after the early 2020s.  JSC SRC Progress had been the manufacturer and custodian of the Soyuz family design for many decades. The new design concept was a part of Project Feniks. While all previous iterations of the Soyuz family had their roots firmly set on the R-7 ICBM legacy, the new rocket, designated Soyuz-7 in 2013, was to be a completely new design from the ground up. The proposed new design was to be based on a new propellant: LOX and liquid methane, use a new tank structure, new propulsion, and would do away with the famous Korolev Cross, and have thrust vector control in the main engine rather than using vernier engines. It was conceived in 2013 to be a scalable family with three versions covering the medium to heavy payload ranges.

The project is considered as fundamental to assure access to space for Russia, since it is transitioning exclusively to the Angara family, and the Soyuz-7 would add redundancy in case of an Angara stand down.

It will use a single RD-0164 engine on the first stage, and a RD-0169 engine on the second. The first engineering design was expected to be completed by 2016, and the first flight expected as early as 2022. The use of just two stages for the base version, and the simplification of subsystems was intended to product a more reliable and less-expensive launch vehicle, with the lightest version expected to be cheaper than the Soyuz-2.

History
During an interview with the Kazakhstani magazine Space Research and Technologies during 2013, Mr. Kirilin, CEO of TSKB Progress, explained the conception of the project. When the Rus-M project was cancelled, TSKB Progress started work on a methane fueled launch vehicle under the Roscosmos Magistral research program. This work was self funded by the company, and looked to replace the Soyuz vehicle and keep the vehicle design capabilities within the company.

The venerable Soyuz rocket vehicle would be an approximately 60-year-old design by 2020 and it could not remain competitive with the new vehicles, like the Falcon 9. It was described by Progress CEO, Mr. Kirilin, as technologically and operationally hopelessly outdated. It has conical sections, where each panel is unique, it uses six engines with 24 nozzles, most rocket manufacturing tasks include a number of manual operations, it even requires five different fluids: kerosene, liquid oxygen, hydrogen peroxide, gaseous nitrogen and gaseous helium. Looking forward, the price of RG-1 fuel was going up, since it could only be distilled from a single oil field, that, by 2015, was expected to be depleted soon.

The proposed Soyuz-7 would use the same diameter for all sections of the rocket, use liquid methane and liquid oxygen, have a single engine with a single nozzle on each stage, and automate most tasks. The proposed new rocket was conceived to use the existing Soyuz pads and installations after some modifications. Liquid methane is cheap, Russia has ample reserves and it has a huge installed base. It also has some important thermal and polymerizing properties that paves the way for reusable rockets. The rocket was expected to use the KBKhA RD-0164 engine in the core stages, and a methane version of the KBKhA RD-0124 in the upper stage.

During an August, 2015 interview with Ria Novosti, Mr. Kirilin stated that a preliminary design was expected in 2015 or 2016, that they intended to first develop a light version, that they anticipated an initial test flight of the first prototype in 2022 and that the propulsion would be the RD-0164 for the cores and the RD-0169 rocket engine for the upper stage.

However, this project, part of Soyuz-5, was abandoned when Soyuz-5 has evolved into a replacement for zenit family named Irtysh, with RKK Energia as manufacturer. The methalox rocket was later renamed to Soyuz-7.

The contract for the preliminary design phase of the Amur was signed on 5 October 2020, to build "the first Russian reusable methane rocket."
Roscosmos has budgeted a "not to exceed" program cost of 70 billion rubles for the development program through the first launch.

The rocket design is expected to follow the practice of SpaceX with the Falcon 9 to design the first stage for reusability. and the rocket engine to be reused 100 or more times.

Versions
In the mid-2010s, Soyuz-7 was conceived to be a scalable family, with three conceptual versions:
 Basic version, designed to replace the Soyuz-2.1a/b rockets, would use just a first and a second stage.
 A three-core-stage version, designed as a crew carrier vehicle, that would use a central core and two equal cores on the side as boosters. This design concept was to have not an air-ignited second stage to eliminate air start risk.
 The heaviest version with maximum capability.

Amur will launch from the Vostochny Cosmodrome in the Russian Far East.

The first stage of the rocket will use grid fins to assist with attitude control during atmospheric reentry and is planned to be powered by five RD-0169A methane-oxygen engines, which are currently being developed at the Chemical Automatics Design Bureau. 
The long-term target is for most of the engines to fire 100 times, but the center engine, reignited for descent through the atmosphere and again for landing operations which will include extending landing legs, will be aimed to eventually reach a life expectancy of 300 engine firings.

The ground test program for the new methalox-propellant engines is expected to be completed by late 2024.

See also 

 Comparison of orbital launch systems
 Falcon 9
Soyuz programme
Soyuz rocket family

References

External links
Anatoly Zak's page on the Soyuz-7

Space launch vehicles of Russia
Proposed space launch vehicles
Partially reusable space launch vehicles
Roscosmos